Mary Kay Wagner (born January 14, 1949) is an American lawyer and retired judge.  She served 30 years as a Wisconsin circuit court judge in Kenosha County (1991–2021) and was chief judge of Wisconsin's 2nd judicial administrative district from 2008 to 2014.  Earlier in her career, she represented Kenosha County in the Wisconsin State Assembly for two terms.

Biography

Born in Burlington, Wisconsin, Wagner graduated from Central High School in Salem, Wisconsin.  She earned her bachelor's degree from the University of Wisconsin–Madison in 1971 and went to work as a teacher.  She was elected Kenosha County Clerk in 1976, then elected to the Wisconsin State Assembly in 1978, representing the 66th assembly district as a Democrat.  She continued her education and, in 1982, earned her J.D. from the University of Wisconsin Law School.  She was re-elected in 1980, but was defeated seeking re-election in 1982 after being redistricted into a matchup with fellow incumbent Cloyd A. Porter.

After leaving the Assembly, Wagner worked as an attorney and state tax commissioner.  In 1991, Kenosha County Circuit Judge Jerold W. Breitenbach declined to seek re-election. Wagner was one of six candidates who decided to run for the open judgeship.  She came in second in the primary but was able to defeat —an ally of then-Governor Tommy Thompson—in the general election by 621 votes.  Judge Wagner went on to win re-election in 1997, 2003, 2009, and 2015.

In 2008, Judge Wagner was appointed Chief Judge of the 2nd Judicial Administrative District by the Wisconsin Supreme Court. She remained chief judge for the maximum 3 two-year terms.  She was Chair of the Committee of Chief Judges in 2013 and 2014.

On November 9, 2020, Wagner announced her plans to step down at the end of her fifth term. She said she loved being a judge, but felt it was time to move on. "I wanted to retire at the end of a term so we could have a good election," she said, saying she wanted to make sure she left the bench when her replacement would be elected rather than appointed mid-term.

Former Deputy District Attorney Angelina Gabriele was elected April 6, 2021, to take over the Branch 6 seat beginning August 1, 2021.

Personal life and family

On September 11, 1982, Wagner married Judge John E. Malloy, who was then a Wisconsin Circuit Court Judge in Kenosha County.

Electoral history

Wisconsin Assembly (1978, 1980, 1982)

| colspan="6" style="text-align:center;background-color: #e9e9e9;"| Primary Election, September 12, 1978

| colspan="6" style="text-align:center;background-color: #e9e9e9;"| General Election, November 7, 1978

| colspan="6" style="text-align:center;background-color: #e9e9e9;"| General Election, November 4, 1980

| colspan="6" style="text-align:center;background-color: #e9e9e9;"| General Election, November 2, 1982

Wisconsin Circuit Court (1991, 1997, 2003, 2009, 2015)

| colspan="6" style="text-align:center;background-color: #e9e9e9;"| Primary Election, February 19, 1991

| colspan="6" style="text-align:center;background-color: #e9e9e9;"| General Election, April 2, 1991

References

External links
 

1949 births
Living people
People from Burlington, Wisconsin
People from Brighton, Kenosha County, Wisconsin
University of Wisconsin–Madison alumni
University of Wisconsin Law School alumni
County clerks in Wisconsin
Wisconsin state court judges
Women state legislators in Wisconsin
Democratic Party members of the Wisconsin State Assembly